Gabrje (in older sources also Gabrije) is a small settlement on the right bank of the Mirna River in the Municipality of Sevnica in central Slovenia. The area is part of the historical region of Lower Carniola. The municipality is now included in the Lower Sava Statistical Region.

References

External links
Gabrje at Geopedia

Populated places in the Municipality of Sevnica